Short Beach may refer to:

Places
Short Beach, Connecticut.
Short Beach, New York
Short Beach, Oregon
Short Beach, Nova Scotia